St. Thomas' School is a Christian Missionary School located in Pune.

It was promoted by the inspiration of Sir Adams. 

The school comes under the control of the Maharashtra State Board of Secondary and Higher Secondary Education.

The school has both male and female students.

The school has 3 floors, each of which consists of 7 rooms.

See also
List of schools in Pune

References

External links
 

Christian schools in Maharashtra
High schools and secondary schools in Maharashtra
Schools in Pune